Rahasyam is a 1967 Indian Telugu-language swashbuckler film directed by Vedantam Raghavayya. It stars Akkineni Nageswara Rao, B. Saroja Devi, Kanta Rao, Krishna Kumari and S. V. Ranga Rao, with music composed by Ghantasala. The film was produced by Allareddy Shankar Reddy under the Lalitha Siva Jyothi Films banner.

Plot
Saint Rakthabhisha (S. V. Ranga Rao) & Sriganda (Gummadi), king of Kanchipuram are disciples of Sage Narada (Haranath) both of them develop rivalry feeling that one is superior to the other. Rakthabhisha is a great devotee of Goddess Lalitha (Anjali Devi), he contracts an underground temple and performs a huge penance. The goddess appears before him, he asks her for salvation and she replies that he can attain it only after enjoying the marital life and being blessed with a son. Then he requests her to stay in that temple and see that except him no one could enter into it when Goddess presents him with a powerful ring without it even he cannot enter into it. After that, Rakthabhisha reaches Chandrapuri kingdom along with his assistant Krishna (Ramana Reddy), who is a crack and relieves people from their pain. Mandaka (Akkineni Nageswara Rao) is a young & energetic guy, the son of Nityananda whose co-student Rakthabhisha visits for his blessings. At the same time, Karunakara (V. Nagayya), king of Chandrapuri brings his blind daughter Rajyalakshmi (Krishna Kumari) & lame niece Kumari (B. Saroja Devi). Sriganda also reaches there and challenges Rakthabhisha to create heaven and he does so by transforming Mandaka into Indra, Rajyalakshmi & Kumari into Apsara. Sriganda immediately makes it disappear but he could not remove the women's beauty. Here Sriganda is attracted to Rajyalakshmi and sends his men to kidnap her when a prince Ravi Chandra (Kanta Rao) comes to her protection, Mandaka also helps him in rescuing Rajyalakshmi. King Karunakara gives them hospitality when Karunakara adopts Mandaka and Ravi Chandra & Mandaka become good friends.

Meanwhile, Mandaka & Kumari, Ravi Chandra & Rajyalakshmi love each other. Eventually, Sriganda sends his marriage proposal to Rajyalakshmi to Karunakara when Mandaka uses his tactics and performs the marriage of Ravi Chandra & Rajyalakshmi. Chandramma (G. Varalakshmi), sister of Karunakara who is not acceptable with it leaves Kanchipuram along with her daughter Kumari intending to make Kumari's marriage with Sriganda. Sriganda invites them, Mandaka also reaches there and joins in the court as a dance teacher to Kumari in disguise. After some time, Rajyalakshmi becomes pregnant and Ravi Chandra leaves for his hometown when Sriganda plans to conquer Chandrapuri. He lures Karunakara's army chief commander Durjaya, captures the kingdom, and makes Karunakara arrested. But somehow Karunakara can make Rajyalakshmi escape. Knowing this, Mandaka tries to release Karunakara but he is chased by the soldiers. Then, Rakthabhisha loses the divine ring which Mandaka obtains. To escape from the soldiers he enters the temple brings Krishna too and makes him normal. Surprisingly, Mandaka learns the actual secret through Krishna that Rakthabhisha is transformed into Ravi Chandra to attain his salvation when Mandaka becomes furious and decides not to allow this injustice. Parallelly, they find Rajyalakshmi, by the time, she gives birth to a baby boy and Mandaka sends her with Krishna. Simultaneously, Mandaka plots to take Rakthabhisha to the temple where he keeps the ring at the goddess's feet and asks for a boon to transform Rakthabhisha into Ravi Chandra. The goddess appears, removes all supernatural powers of Rakthabhisha, and permanently changes him into Ravi Chandra. Eventually, Sriganda plans to crown his lieutenant Virupaksha (Rajanala) as king of Chandrapuri and perform his marriage with Kumari. On the way, they find Rajyalakshmi and forcibly take her. Krishna reveals it to Mandaka & Ravi Chandra, both of them attack the fort where Sriganda is defeated and he too loses all his powers. At last, Karunakara is again crowned and Rajyalakshmi is united with Ravi Chandra. Finally, the movie ends on a happy note with the marriage of Mandaka & Kumari.

Cast

Akkineni Nageswara Rao as Mandakudu
B. Saroja Devi as Kumari
Kanta Rao as Ravi Chandra
Krishna Kumari as Rajyalakshmi 
S. V. Ranga Rao as Rakthabhisha
Gummadi as Sriganda Prabhu
V. Nagayya as Karunakara Maharaju
Rajanala as Virupakshudu
Relangi as Trishankhu
Ramana Reddy as Krishna 
Haranath as Narada Maharshi
Anjali Devi as Goddess Aadi Parashakthi
G. Varalakshmi as Chandramma
Suryakantam as Mallamma 
Girija as Sarvani Devi 
Geethanjali as Meenakshi
Jayanthi
Jhansi as Kamakshi

Music 

Music was composed by Ghantasala.

References

External links
 

1960s Telugu-language films
1967 films
Films scored by Ghantasala (musician)
Films directed by Vedantam Raghavayya